Lagan Lal Chaudhary is a Nepalese politician. He is a member of Provincial Assembly of Madhesh Province from CPN (Unified Marxist–Leninist). Chaudhary, a resident of Lahan, was elected via 2017 Nepalese provincial elections from Siraha 1(A).

Electoral history

2017 Nepalese provincial elections

References

Living people
Year of birth missing (living people)
Madhesi people
21st-century Nepalese politicians
Members of the Provincial Assembly of Madhesh Province
Communist Party of Nepal (Unified Marxist–Leninist) politicians